CrossFit Mayhem is a CrossFit affiliate located in Cookeville, Tennessee. Mayhem was started in 2009 by Rich Froning Jr. in his father's barn as a place to train. In 2012, Rich opened the original downtown facility, but almost immediately began plans to expand. That relocation/expansion occurred in 2016. Due in large part to Froning's success at the CrossFit Games, Crossfit Mayhem has become something of a pilgrimage site for many Crossfit Athletes and fans.

CrossFit Mayhem has fielded one or more teams at the CrossFit Games since 2013, and the team led by Rich Froning has won all the team competitions at the Games from 2015 to 2021 apart from 2017 when they came second, and 2020 when no team competition was held.

CrossFit Games 
While the Affiliate Cup first appeared in 2009, CrossFit Mayhem first fielded a competitive team only in 2013 when it finished 27th.

In 2015, upon retiring from individual competition, Rich Froning joined the CrossFit Mayhem team and the team has not finished lower than 2nd place at the CrossFit Games since, despite significant turnover of athletes. The 2015 team was titled CrossFit Mayhem Freedom.  The team achieved back-to-back wins in 2015 and 2016.

In 2017, the team competed as CrossFit Mayhem.  However, this year the team finished 48 points behind Wasatch CrossFit in second place.

2018 was the first time that CrossFit Mayhem competed two teams at the CrossFit Games. Mayhem Freedom took home the Championship after a year out of the top spot, while Mayhem Independence narrowly missed a podium spot, finishing 4th overall.

In 2019, the Affiliate Cup was put on pause, as Teams no longer had to belong to the same CrossFit Affiliate in order to compete together. This ushered in the brief era of the "Super Teams," though it did little to affect Mayhem's success in CrossFit Competition. Mayhem Freedom repeated as the 2019 CrossFit Games Champions.

Also in 2019, Elly Kabboord tested positive for the performance-enhancing substance clenbuterol, receiving a four-year ban from the sport and forcing Mayhem to re-shuffle their roster, adding Carolyne Prevost to the Independence team in time for the French Throwdown. Due in part to these changes, Independence failed to qualify.

Due to the COVID-19 Pandemic, CrossFit was forced to make significant changes to the 2020 CrossFit Games, one of which was the elimination of team competition. Froning attempted to organize a replacement team competition titled Mayhem Madness, but that too had to be cancelled due to travel restriction.

In 2021, CrossFit returned to the Affiliate Cup model, resulting in the ineligibility of Scott Panchik and Chyna Cho. Andrea Nisler and Taylor Williamson, formerly of Mayhem competitor OC3 Black, both joined the team, along with Rich's cousin Chase Hill. CrossFit Mayhem was crowned the 2021 CrossFit Games Affiliate Cup Champion for the 5th time.

In 2022, CrossFit Mayhem has three teams qualified for the CrossFit Games, the first time three teams from the same gym location qualified for the Games (previously Invictus sent three teams but from different locations). Samuel Cournoyer joined the Froning-led CrossFit Mayhem Freedom team, which won the teams competition at the Games. Froning announced his retirement from team competition in October 2022 after winning their sixth title.

CrossFit Games results table

CrossFit Games Team Roster

Significant current and former Mayhem athletes 
 Rich Froning, Jr
 Mat Fraser 
 Tia-Clair Toomey
 Scott Panchik
 Dan Bailey
 Chyna Cho
 Sara Sigmundsdottir
 Josh Bridges
 Haley Adams

References

External links 
 

Cookeville, Tennessee micropolitan area
CrossFit
Sports in Tennessee